The Wu Feng Park is a park in Zhongpu Township, Chiayi County, Taiwan.

Name
The name of the park is derived from the name of a government official called Wu Feng. He used to resolve disputes between indigenous peoples and the Han Chinese on the lowland, which he earned respect from both groups.

Architecture
The park has low, red-clay walls which enclose and divide the site with huge character. There are many octagonal, circular and jar-shaped openings, windows and doorways. The central courtyard is devoted to an exhibition that shows Alishan's past, present and proposed future developments. There is also a large display showing off the history and modern crafts of the region's Tsou aboriginal tribe. It houses the headquarters of Alishan National Scenic Area.

See also
 List of parks in Taiwan

References

Parks in Chiayi County